Charles Basson (21 April 1894 – 9 October 1948) was a South African cricketer. He played in five first-class matches for Eastern Province in 1921/22 and 1922/23.

See also
 List of Eastern Province representative cricketers

References

External links
 

1894 births
1948 deaths
South African cricketers
Eastern Province cricketers
People from Uitenhage
Cricketers from the Eastern Cape